Peter Tatsuo Doi (土井 辰雄 Doi Tatsuo) (22 December 1892 – 21 February 1970) was a Japanese Cardinal of the Catholic Church. He served as Archbishop of Tokyo from 1937 until his death, and was elevated to the cardinalate in 1960.

Biography 
Doi was born in Sendai. He was baptized at the age of nine, on 21 April 1902. He studied at the seminary in Sendai and the Pontifical Urbaniana University in Rome.

Doi was ordained to the priesthood on 1 May 1921. Doi then did pastoral work in Sendai until 1934, when he was made Secretary of the Apostolic Delegation to Japan.

On 2 December 1937, Doi was appointed Archbishop of Tokyo by Pope Pius XI. He received his episcopal consecration on 13 February 1938 from Archbishop Jean-Alexis Chambon, MEP, with Bishops Paul Aijiro Yamaguchi and Marie-Joseph Lemieux serving as co-consecrators. During World War II, Doi served as executive director of the National Catholic Central Committee. He was Apostolic Administrator of Yokohama from 1945 to 1947.

Pope John XXIII created him Cardinal Priest of S. Antonio da Padova in Via Merulana in the consistory of 28 March 1960. Doi, hoped by the Vatican to enliven the Church in Japan, thus became the first Japanese member of the College of Cardinals. He attended the Second Vatican Council from 1962 to 1965, and was later one of the cardinal electors who participated in the 1963 papal conclave that selected Pope Paul VI.

Doi died in Tokyo, aged 77. He is buried in St. Mary's Cathedral.

Doi, along with Stefan Wyszyński, assisted Paul Peter Meouchi in delivering one of the closing messages of the Second Vatican Council on 8  December 1965.

References

External links 
 
 Catholic-Hierarchy 

1892 births
1970 deaths
20th-century Roman Catholic archbishops in Japan
Cardinals created by Pope John XXIII
Japanese cardinals
Participants in the Second Vatican Council
People from Sendai
Pontifical Urban University alumni
Japanese Roman Catholic archbishops